"(This Ain't No) Drunk Dial" is a song recorded by American country music group A Thousand Horses.  It is the second single from their album Southernality.  The band's lead vocalist Michael Hobby co-wrote the song, along with Corey Crowder, Neil Mason and Cale Dodds.

Critical reception
An uncredited Taste of Country review stated that "“(This Ain’t No) Drunk Dial” is a strong follow-up to a chart-topper that took little time in standing out from the clutter on the radio. It’s similar enough to add another brick to the group’s Dixie-rock-country brand, but the story separates it from what they previously released."

Music video
The music video was directed by Peter Zavadil and premiered in June 2015. It features the band performing the song in a courthouse hallway, and them testifying in front of a judges panel.

Chart performance

Year-end charts

References

2015 songs
2015 singles
A Thousand Horses songs
Republic Nashville singles
Music videos directed by Peter Zavadil
Songs written by Corey Crowder (songwriter)
Song recordings produced by Dave Cobb